The 15th Satellite Awards is an award ceremony honoring the year's outstanding performers, films, television shows, home videos and interactive media, presented by the International Press Academy at the Hyatt Regency Century Plaza in Century City, Los Angeles.

The nominations were announced on December 1, 2010. The winners were announced on December 19, 2010.

Special achievement awards
Auteur Award (for his work as a documentary film director and producer) – Alex Gibney

Humanitarian Award (for community involvement and work on social causes) – Connie Stevens

Mary Pickford Award (for outstanding contribution to the entertainment industry) – Vanessa Williams

Nikola Tesla Award (for his work as film preservationist and historian) – Robert A. Harris

Motion picture winners and nominees

Best Actor – Drama
 Colin Firth – The King's Speech
 Javier Bardem – Biutiful
 Leonardo DiCaprio – Inception
 Michael Douglas – Solitary Man
 Robert Duvall – Get Low
 Jesse Eisenberg – The Social Network
 James Franco – 127 Hours
 Ryan Gosling – Blue Valentine

Best Actor – Musical or Comedy
 Michael Cera – Scott Pilgrim vs. the World
 Steve Carell – Dinner for Schmucks
 Romain Duris – Heartbreaker
 Andy García – City Island
 Jake Gyllenhaal – Love & Other Drugs
 John Malkovich – Red
 John C. Reilly – Cyrus

Best Actress – Drama
 Noomi Rapace – The Girl with the Dragon Tattoo
 Nicole Kidman – Rabbit Hole
 Jennifer Lawrence – Winter's Bone
 Helen Mirren – The Tempest
 Natalie Portman – Black Swan
 Tilda Swinton – I Am Love
 Naomi Watts – Fair Game
 Michelle Williams – Blue Valentine

Best Actress – Musical or Comedy
 Anne Hathaway – Love & Other Drugs
 Annette Bening – The Kids Are All Right
 Sally Hawkins – Made in Dagenham
 Catherine Keener – Please Give
 Julianne Moore – The Kids Are All Right
 Mary-Louise Parker – Red
 Marisa Tomei – Cyrus

Best Animated or Mixed Media Film
 Toy Story 3
 Alice in Wonderland
 Despicable Me
 How to Train Your Dragon
 The Illusionist
 Legend of the Guardians: The Owls of Ga'Hoole

Best Art Direction and Production Design
 Inception
 Alice in Wonderland
 Black Swan
 Coco Chanel & Igor Stravinsky
 I Am Love
 Scott Pilgrim vs. the World
 Shutter Island

Best Cinematography
 Inception
 127 Hours
 Harry Potter and the Deathly Hallows – Part 1
 I Am Love
 Salt
 Secretariat
 Shutter Island
 Unstoppable

Best Costume Design
 Alice in Wonderland
 Black Swan
 Eat Pray Love
 The King's Speech
 Robin Hood

Best Director
 David Fincher – The Social Network
 Ben Affleck – The Town
 Darren Aronofsky – Black Swan
 Danny Boyle – 127 Hours
 Lisa Cholodenko – The Kids Are All Right
 Debra Granik – Winter's Bone
 Tom Hooper – The King's Speech
 David Michôd – Animal Kingdom
 Christopher Nolan – Inception
 Roman Polanski – The Ghost Writer

Best Documentary Film
 Restrepo
 Behind the Burly Q
 Client 9: The Rise and Fall of Eliot Spitzer
 Countdown to Zero
 A Film Unfinished
 Inside Job
 Joan Rivers: A Piece of Work
 Sequestro
 The Tillman Story
 Waiting for "Superman"

Best Editing
 Please Give
 Inception
 Shutter Island
 The Social Network
 The Town
 Unstoppable

Best Film – Drama
 The Social Network
 127 Hours
 Animal Kingdom
 Blue Valentine
 Get Low
 The Ghost Writer
 Inception
 The King's Speech
 The Town
 Winter's Bone

Best Film – Musical or Comedy
 Scott Pilgrim vs. the World
 Cyrus
 The Kids Are All Right
 Made in Dagenham
 The Other Guys
 Please Give
 Red

Best Foreign Language Film
 The Girl with the Dragon Tattoo (Sweden)
 Biutiful (Mexico)
 I Am Love (Italy)
 Mother (Korea)
 Outside the Law (Algeria)
 Soul Kitchen (Germany)
 White Material (France)

Best Original Score
 Inception
 127 Hours
 Black Swan
 The Eclipse
 Harry Potter and the Deathly Hallows – Part 1
 Salt
 The Social Network
 Unstoppable

Best Original Song
 "You Haven't Seen the Last of Me" – Burlesque
 "Alice" – Alice in Wonderland
 "Country Strong" – Country Strong
 "Eclipse (All Yours)" – The Twilight Saga: Eclipse
 "If I Rise" – 127 Hours
 "What Part of Forever" – The Twilight Saga: Eclipse

Best Screenplay – Adapted
 The Social Network
 127 Hours
 Fair Game
 The Ghost Writer
 The Girl with the Dragon Tattoo
 Scott Pilgrim vs. the World
 The Town
 Winter's Bone

Best Screenplay – Original
 The King's Speech
 Biutiful
 The Eclipse
 Get Low
 Inception
 The Kids Are All Right
 Toy Story 3

Best Sound
 Unstoppable
 127 Hours
 Inception
 Iron Man 2
 Nowhere Boy
 Secretariat
 Shutter Island

Best Supporting Actor
 Christian Bale – The Fighter
 Pierce Brosnan – The Ghost Writer
 Andrew Garfield – The Social Network
 Tommy Lee Jones – The Company Men
 Bill Murray – Get Low
 Sean Penn – Fair Game
 Jeremy Renner – The Town
 Geoffrey Rush – The King's Speech

Best Supporting Actress
 Jacki Weaver – Animal Kingdom
 Amy Adams – The Fighter
 Marion Cotillard – Inception
 Anne-Marie Duff – Nowhere Boy
 Vanessa Redgrave – Letters to Juliet
 Rosamund Pike – Barney's Version
 Kristin Scott Thomas – Nowhere Boy
 Dianne Wiest – Rabbit Hole

Best Visual Effects
 Alice in Wonderland
 127 Hours
 Inception
 Iron Man 2
 Legend of the Guardians: The Owls of Ga'Hoole
 Unstoppable

Television winners and nominees

Best Actor – Drama Series
 Bryan Cranston – Breaking Bad
 Kyle Chandler – Friday Night Lights
 Josh Charles – The Good Wife
 Michael C. Hall – Dexter
 Jon Hamm – Mad Men
 Stephen Moyer – True Blood

Best Actor – Musical or Comedy Series
 Alec Baldwin – 30 Rock
 Steve Carell – The Office
 Thomas Jane – Hung
 Danny McBride – Eastbound & Down
 Matthew Morrison – Glee
 Jim Parsons – The Big Bang Theory

Best Actor – Miniseries or TV Film
 Al Pacino – You Don't Know Jack
 Benedict Cumberbatch – Sherlock
 Idris Elba – Luther
 Ian McShane – The Pillars of the Earth
 Barry Pepper – When Love Is Not Enough: The Lois Wilson Story
 Dennis Quaid – The Special Relationship
 David Suchet – Agatha Christie's Poirot: Murder on the Orient Express

Best Actress – Drama Series
 Connie Britton – Friday Night Lights
 January Jones – Mad Men
 Julianna Margulies – The Good Wife
 Elisabeth Moss – Mad Men
 Anna Paquin – True Blood
 Katey Sagal – Sons of Anarchy

Best Actress – Musical or Comedy Series
 Laura Linney – The Big C
 Jane Adams – Hung
 Toni Collette – United States of Tara
 Edie Falco – Nurse Jackie
 Tina Fey – 30 Rock
 Lea Michele – Glee
 Mary-Louise Parker – Weeds

Best Actress – Miniseries or TV Film
 Claire Danes – Temple Grandin
 Hope Davis – The Special Relationship
 Judi Dench – Return to Cranford
 Naomie Harris – Small Island
 Ellie Kendrick – The Diary of Anne Frank
 Winona Ryder – When Love Is Not Enough: The Lois Wilson Story
 Ruth Wilson – Luther

Best Miniseries
 Sherlock
 Carlos
 Emma
 The Pacific
 The Pillars of the Earth
 Small Island

Best Series – Drama
 Breaking Bad
 Boardwalk Empire
 Dexter
 Friday Night Lights
 The Good Wife
 Mad Men
 The Tudors

Best Series – Musical or Comedy
 The Big C
 30 Rock
 Glee
 Modern Family
 Nurse Jackie
 Raising Hope
 United States of Tara

Best Supporting Actor – Miniseries or TV Film
 David Strathairn – Temple Grandin
 Ty Burrell – Modern Family
 Bruce Campbell – Burn Notice
 Chris Colfer – Glee
 Alan Cumming – The Good Wife
 Neil Patrick Harris – How I Met Your Mother
 Aaron Paul – Breaking Bad
 Martin Short – Damages

Best Supporting Actress – Miniseries or TV Film
 Brenda Vaccaro – You Don't Know Jack
 Julie Bowen – Modern Family
 Rose Byrne – Damages
 Sharon Gless – Burn Notice
 Jane Lynch – Glee
 Catherine O'Hara – Temple Grandin
 Archie Panjabi – The Good Wife

Best TV Film
 Temple Grandin
 The Diary of Anne Frank
 The Special Relationship
 When Love Is Not Enough: The Lois Wilson Story
 You Don't Know Jack

Awards breakdown

Film
Winners:
3 / 7 The Social Network: Best Director / Best Film – Drama / Best Screenplay – Adapted
3 / 11 Inception: Best Art Direction and Production Design / Best Cinematography / Best Original Score
2 / 4 Scott Pilgrim vs. the World: Best Actor – Musical or Comedy / Best Film – Musical or Comedy
2 / 5 Alice in Wonderland: Best Costume Design / Best Visual Effects
2 / 6 The King's Speech: Best Actor – Drama / Best Screenplay – Original
1 / 1 Burlesque: Best Original Song
1 / 1 Restrepo: Best Documentary Film
1 / 2 The Fighter: Best Supporting Actor
1 / 2 Love & Other Drugs: Best Actress – Musical or Comedy
1 / 2 Toy Story 3: Best Animated or Mixed Media Film
1 / 3 Animal Kingdom: Best Supporting Actress
1 / 3 The Girl with the Dragon Tattoo: Best Actress – Drama / Best Foreign Language Film
1 / 3 Please Give: Best Editing
1 / 5 Unstoppable: Best Sound

Losers:
0 / 9 127 Hours
0 / 5 Black Swan, The Kids Are All Right, The Town
0 / 4 Get Low, The Ghost Writer, I Am Love, Shutter Island, Winter's Bone
0 / 3 Biutiful, Blue Valentine, Cyrus, Fair Game, Nowhere Boy, Red
0 / 2 The Eclipse, Harry Potter and the Deathly Hallows – Part 1, Iron Man 2, Legend of the Guardians: The Owls of Ga'Hoole, Made in Dagenham, Rabbit Hole, Salt, Secretariat

Television
Winners:
3 / 4 Temple Grandin: Best Actress – Miniseries or TV Film / Best Supporting Actor – Miniseries or TV Film / Best TV Film
2 / 2 The Big C: Best Actress – Musical or Comedy Series / Best Series – Musical or Comedy
2 / 3 Breaking Bad: Best Actor – Drama Series / Best Series – Drama
2 / 3 You Don't Know Jack: Best Actor – Miniseries or TV Film / Best Supporting Actress – Miniseries or TV Film
1 / 2 Sherlock: Best Miniseries
1 / 3 30 Rock: Best Actor – Musical or Comedy Series
1 / 3 Friday Night Lights: Best Actress – Drama Series

Losers:
0 / 5 Glee, The Good Wife
0 / 4 Mad Men
0 / 3 Modern Family, The Special Relationship, When Love Is Not Enough: The Lois Wilson Story
0 / 2 Burn Notice, Damages, Dexter, The Diary of Anne Frank, Hung, Luther, Nurse Jackie, The Pillars of the Earth, Small Island, True Blood, United States of Tara

References

External links
 International Press Academy website

Satellite Awards ceremonies
2010 film awards
2010 television awards
2010 video game awards